Galerius Peak is the ice-covered peak rising to 1259 m and forming the north extremity of Lassus Mountains, northern Alexander Island in Antarctica. It surmounts Iliev Glacier to the west, Palestrina Glacier to the north and McManus Glacier to the east.

The feature is named after the Thracian-born Roman Emperor Galerius, 293-311 AD, who issued in Serdica (present Sofia) the Edict of Toleration legitimizing Christianity in the Roman Empire in 311 AD.

Location
British mapping in 1971.

Maps
 British Antarctic Territory. Scale 1:200000 topographic map. DOS 610 – W 69 70. Tolworth, UK, 1971
 Antarctic Digital Database (ADD). Scale 1:250000 topographic map of Antarctica. Scientific Committee on Antarctic Research (SCAR). Since 1993, regularly upgraded and updated

Notes

References
 Bulgarian Antarctic Gazetteer. Antarctic Place-names Commission. (details in Bulgarian, basic data in English)
 Galerius Peak. SCAR Composite Gazetteer of Antarctica

External links
 Galerius Peak. Adjusted Copernix satellite image

Mountains of Alexander Island
Bulgaria and the Antarctic